Shankar Oraon is an Indian footballer who has played for Mohun Bagan A.C. in the I-League as a forward.

Career

Prayag United
On 2 April 2011 Oraon scored his first goal for Prayag United S.C. against Dempo, this was also Oraon's first professional game of his career. He then scored again in his second game of his career against Churchill Brothers

Mohun Bagan
After spending three years at Prayag United S.C. Oraon signed for Mohun Bagan A.C. 
He made his debut for Mohun Bagan in the I-League on 22 September 2013 against Bengaluru FC at the Bangalore Football Stadium in which he came on as a substitute for Adil Khan in the 79th minute as Mohun Bagan drew the match 1-1.

Honours
Prayag United
IFA Shield: 2013

References

External links
 
 goal.com

1989 births
Living people
Indian footballers
United SC players
Mohun Bagan AC players
I-League players
Footballers from Chennai
Association football forwards
Calcutta Football League players